Mark Zug is an artist and illustrator who is known for his work with the Septimus Heap series and Harlan Ellison's adaptation of I, Robot. He has illustrated many collectible card games, including Magic: The Gathering and Dune, as well as books and magazines. He lives in Pennsylvania.

Biography 
Zug began drawing in childhood. His early art was inspired by authors such as Frank Herbert and J. R. R. Tolkien as a teen. He later worked as a class-A machinist at a nearby factory while experimenting with a musical career.

Rise to prominence
He returned to art, inspired by Frank Frazetta and illustrators of the Brandywine School. He started painting in oil and attended art school for 2.5 years (no diploma). He capped his tutorial by ghost-painting western novel covers and penciling historical comic strips on the side. His first big break came in 1992 illustrating Harlan Ellison's I, Robot: The Illustrated Screenplay, for which he also did 160 pages of fully painted comics. He fulfilled a long-held dream of illustrating Frank Herbert's Dune universe - in the form of Last Unicorn's collectible card game of the same name, which proved a springboard into game illustration.

Present
His works have appeared on the covers of novels by authors like Tanith Lee, Diana Wynne Jones, Hilari Bell, the Dragonlance series, Star Wars comics, the magazines Popular Science, Dragon, Dungeon, Duelist, Inquest, Star Wars Gamer, Amazing Stories, and graced many fantasy game products and brands like Shadowrun, Battletech, Dune, and Magic: The Gathering. He has also done cover artwork for novels by Angie Sage. His work is included in the book Masters of Dragonlance Art.

His first work with children's novels was illustrating the cover art and the inside pictures for the Septimus Heap series by Angie Sage. He has illustrated all seven released novels.

Critical acclaim
Zug has received quite a few accolades for his visually stunning artwork. His work in the Nancy Yi Fan novel Swordbird was acclaimed, saying that "Mark Zug's black-and-white drawings repeat strategically, offering a visual underpinning to the characters and story line." He was nominated for a Chesley and received the Jack Gaughan Award for Best Emerging Artist in 2001.

Bibliography
Novels:
2005: Septimus Heap, Book One: Magyk
2006: Septimus Heap, Book Two: Flyte
2007: Septimus Heap, Book Three: Physik
2008: Septimus Heap, Book Four: Queste
2009: Septimus Heap, Book Five: Syren
2011: Septimus Heap, Book Six: Darke
2013: Septimus Heap, Book Seven: Fyre

Interior Art:
1995: Illustrations (I, Robot: The Illustrated Screenplay)
1999: A Whisper of Caladan Seas
2000: High Jump

Cover Art:
1995: Cover - I, Robot: The Illustrated Screenplay
1996: Cover - Gold Unicorn
1997: Cover - Red Unicorn
1998: Cover - Amazing Stories, Fall 1998
2003: Cover - The Alabaster Staff
2003: Cover - The Best of The Realms
2003: Cover - Wild Robert
2005: Cover - The Shattered Land
2005: Cover - Septimus Heap, Magyk
2006: Cover - Septimus Heap, Flyte
2007: Cover - Septimus Heap, Physik
2008: Cover - Septimus Heap, Queste
2009: Cover - Septimus Heap, Syren
2011: Cover - Septimus Heap, Darke
2013: Cover - Septimus Heap, Fyre

Dungeons & Dragons
2001: Lords of Darkness (cover)
2007: Rules Compendium

Awards
Mark Zug has won a few awards for his outstanding works
2001 - Jack Gaughan Award for Best Emerging Artist
2005 - Chesley Award for Best Gaming Related Illustration (2005)
2010 - Illie Award for "Helium" presented at IlluXCon

References

External links
Official Mark Zug website - link to the fantasy world of Mark Zug
Mark Zug bibliography

1959 births
American illustrators
Artists from Fort Wayne, Indiana
Artists from Pennsylvania
Fantasy artists
Living people
Role-playing game artists
Septimus Heap